William Thursfield (born 19 April 1986) is a former Australian rules footballer who played for the Richmond Football Club in the Australian Football League (AFL).  Known as a courageous backman who has stood some of the more notable forwards of the current game. He is an elevated rookie.

Thursfield was born in Oxford in England, moving to Australia at age 3.

Will attended Brighton Grammar and in years 8–10 and played in the 1st XVII.  In 2003 he played in the combined APS team against AGS (Associated Grammar Schools).

2004 saw Will play for the Sandringham Dragons Under 18s TAC Cup team as vice-captain.

Thursfield made his debut in round 14, 2005 against eventual premiers Sydney. His first assignment was handling key-forward Michael O'Loughlin. He impressed straight away by keeping the Swans forward to 1 goal, as the Tigers upset Sydney by a solitary point.

Thursfield retired at the end of the 2011 season, having played ten senior matches for the year. He stated that, although he was "proud to have played the game at the highest level over the past seven seasons", there were "some other avenues in [his] life" that he was "keen to pursue".

References

External links

Richmond Football Club players
Living people
English emigrants to Australia
VFL/AFL players born in England
1986 births
People educated at Brighton Grammar School
Australian rules footballers from Victoria (Australia)
Ormond Amateur Football Club players
Coburg Football Club players
Sportspeople from Oxford